C. minuta  may refer to:

 Calidris minuta, the little stint, a very small wader species
 Calluella minuta, a frog species endemic to Malaysia
 Catocala minuta, the little underwing, a moth species found the United States
 Chiltonia minuta, an amphipod crustacean species endemic to New Zealand

See also
 Minuta